Imre Kiss (born 10 August 1957) is a Hungarian former footballer who played at both professional and international levels as a goalkeeper.

Career
Kiss was a squad member of the Hungarian national team at the 1982 FIFA World Cup. However, he was never capped for his country.

References

1957 births
Living people
Hungarian footballers
1982 FIFA World Cup players
Association football goalkeepers